Simla Accord may refer to

Simla Accord (1914), signed in 1914, to purported to settle a dispute over the boundary line between inner and outer Tibet.
Simla Agreement, signed between India and Pakistan in July 1972. It followed from the war between the two nations in the previous year that had led to the independence of East Pakistan as Bangladesh.